Freaks of Nature is the twelfth studio album by the American rock band Kansas, released in 1995. Two edited singles were issued but did not chart, nor did the album itself, making it the only Kansas studio album not to appear on any Billboard chart. The band promoted the album by touring with the Alan Parsons Project, and then opening for Styx.

Production
Recorded in Trinidad, the album was produced by Jeff Glixman. Violinist David Ragsdale cowrote four of Freaks of Nature'''s songs. The band chose to forgo the overproduction of previous albums, including eschewing orchestral instrumentation.

Critical receptionEntertainment Weekly wrote that "the techno synths and hoedown fiddles of 'Need' and the AOR schmaltz and African drums on 'I Can Fly' are fairly innovative syntheses." The Washington Post determined that the band "continues to sound like a middle-American knockoff of such British predecessors as Yes." 

The Deseret News noted that "the world-rhythm-inspired 'Need' adds a new angle to Kansas' Midwest progression while the album's title cut is pure, blues-based rock-a-rolla." USA Today concluded: "If you insist on listening to overblown art-rock, the band's new Freaks of Nature'' album isn't any worse than 'Carry On Wayward Son'."

Track listing

Personnel
Phil Ehart - drums, percussion
Rich Williams - guitar, backing vocals
Steve Walsh - lead vocals, keyboards
Billy Greer - bass, guitar, backing vocals
Greg Robert - keyboards, backing vocals
David Ragsdale - violin, backing vocals

References

External links
 David Ragsdale Track by Track Interview about Freaks of Nature from 2015 with The Pods & Sods Network

Kansas (band) albums
1995 albums
Albums produced by Jeff Glixman
Castle Communications albums
Sony Records albums